The Episcopal Church in Wyoming is the diocese of the Episcopal Church in the United States of America with jurisdiction over the state of Wyoming, except for one congregation in western Wyoming which is included in the Episcopal Diocese of Idaho. It was established in 1887 and is in Province VI. Its cathedral, St Matthew's Episcopal Cathedral is in Laramie while the diocesan offices are in Casper.

Paul-Gordon Chandler is the 10th Bishop of Wyoming. His consecration was held on February 13, 2021 in Laramie, Wyoming. He succeeded John Sheridan Smylie.

Missionary Bishops
The Missionary District of Idaho and Wyoming was created by the General Convention of October 1886. The first missionary bishop, whom the Diocese of Wyoming counts as its first diocesan bishop, was Ethelbert Talbot, a pioneering bishop who went on to become Bishop of the Episcopal Diocese of Central Pennsylvania (subsequently the Diocese of Bethlehem) and Presiding Bishop from 1924-1926.

From 1898-1909 the Episcopal Church in Wyoming was overseen by bishops with other responsibilities. Following Talbot's resignation in 1898, the General Convention, meeting in October that year, added Wyoming to the district overseen by Anson Rogers Graves, who had been elected First Missionary Bishop of Nebraska in 1889. Graves oversaw the diocese concurrently with his work in Nebraska until October 1907. Thereafter James B. Funsten, first Bishop of the Missionary District of Boise in Idaho since 1899, and first Bishop of the Episcopal Diocese of Idaho from 1907-1918 had oversight of the Diocese until the consecration and installation of Nathaniel Thomas in October 1909. Thomas is counted as the second diocesan.

Bishops of Wyoming

See also 

Succession of Bishops of The Episcopal Church (U.S.)

References

See also the various editions of the Episcopal Church Annual, Morehouse Publishing, Harrisburg, PA (current edition, 2009) and The Red Book interactive directory of dioceses, parishes and clergy within the Episcopal Church.

External links
 
 Episcopal Church online directory
 St. Matthew's Episcopal Cathedral website
 Episcopal Church. Diocese of Wyoming records at the University of Wyoming - American Heritage Center
Journal of the Annual Convocation

Wyoming
Diocese of Wyoming
Religious organizations established in 1887
Anglican dioceses established in the 19th century
1887 establishments in Wyoming Territory
Province 6 of the Episcopal Church (United States)